Dong Zhongshu (179–104 BC) was a Chinese philosopher, politician, and writer of the Han dynasty. He is traditionally associated with the promotion of Confucianism as the official ideology of the Chinese imperial state. He apparently favored heaven worship over the tradition of cults celebrating the five elements. Ultimately banished to the Chancellery of Weifang by his adversary Gongsun Hong, Gongsun effectively promoted Dong's partial retirement from political life, and his teachings were transmitted from there. However, he apparently enjoyed great influence in the court in the last decades of his life leading up to that.

Biography
Dong was born in modern Hengshui, Hebei in 179 BC. His birthplace is associated with Wencheng Township (now located in Jing Country), so in the Luxuriant Dew of the Spring and Autumn Annals he is once mentioned as Lord Dong of Wencheng.

He entered the imperial service during the reign of Emperor Jing of Han and rose to high office under Emperor Wu of Han. His relationship with the emperor was uneasy though. At one point he was thrown into prison and nearly executed for writings that were considered seditious, and may have cosmologically predicted the overthrow of the Han Dynasty and its replacement by a Confucian sage, the first appearance of a theme that would later sweep Wang Mang to the imperial throne.  He appears to have been protected by the Emperor's chief counselor, Gongsun Hong.

Dong Zhongshu's thought integrated Yin Yang cosmology into a Confucian ethical framework. He emphasised the importance of the Spring and Autumn Annals as a source for both political and metaphysical ideas, following the tradition of the Gongyang Commentary in seeking hidden meanings from its text. He is also considered the originator of the doctrine of Interactions Between Heaven and Mankind, which lays down rules for deciding the legitimacy of a monarch as well as providing a set of checks and balances for a reigning monarch.

There are two works that are attributed to Dong Zhongshu, one of which is the Ju Xianliang Duice in three chapters, preserved under the Book of Han. Another of his major works that has survived to the present is the Luxuriant Dew of the Spring and Autumn Annals in 82 chapters. The Luxuriant Dew of the Spring and Autumn Annals bears many marks of multiple authorship. Whether the work was written by Dong himself has been called into question by several scholars including Zhu Xi, Cheng Yanzuo, Dai Junren, Keimatsu Mitsuo, and Tanaka Masami. Scholars now reject as later additions all the passages that discuss five elements theory, and much of the rest of the work is questionable as well. It seems safest to regard it as a collection of unrelated or loosely related chapters and shorter works, which could be subdivided into five categories. Most are more or less connected to the Gongyang Commentary and its school and written by a number of different persons at different times throughout the Han Dynasty.

Other important sources for Dong Zhongshu's life and thought include his fu The Scholar's Frustration, his biography included in the Book of Han, his Yin Yang and stimulus-response theorizing noted at various places in the Book of Han "Treatise on the Five Elements," and the fragments of his legal discussions.  Dong Zhongshu's theory of 'original qi' (yuanqi or 元氣), the five elements and on the development of history, were later adopted and modified by the late Qing reformer Kang Youwei in order to justify his theories of progress via political reform.  (See Kang Youwei 1987: Kang Youwei Quanji: Volumes one and Two.  Shanghai Guji Chubanshe). It has been questioned, however, how correctly Kang Youwei understood Dong Zhongshu's thought.  (Kuang Bailin 1980: Kang Youwei de zhexue sixiang.  Beijing: Zhongguo shehui kexue chubanshe).

References

Citations

Works cited
 Wm. Theodore de Bary and Irene Bloom (ed.) (1999) Sources of Chinese Tradition (2nd edition), Columbia University Press, 292–310.
 
 
 David W. Pankenier (1990). "The Scholar's Frustration" Reconsidered: Melancholia or Credo?, Journal of the American Oriental Society 110(3):434-59.
 Arbuckle, G. (1995). Inevitable treason: Dong Zhongshu's theory of historical cycles and the devalidation of the Han mandate, Journal of the American Oriental Society 115(4).
 Sarah A. Queen (1996). From Chronicle to Canon: The Hermeneutics of the Spring and Autumn Annals according to Tung Chung-shu, Cambridge University Press.

179 BC births
104 BC deaths
2nd-century BC Chinese philosophers
Chinese Confucianists
Han dynasty philosophers
Han dynasty politicians from Hebei
Philosophers from Hebei
Politicians from Hengshui
Taoist immortals
Writers from Hebei
Chinese reformers